Petar Petretić (1604 – 12 October 1667) was a historian, linguist, and Catholic bishop of the Roman Catholic Archdiocese of Zagreb (1648–1667).

Activities related to Serbs 
With accentuated hatred Petretić (and Benedikt Vinković) wrote numerous obviously untrue texts and even larger elaborates against Serbs and Orthodox Christianity, with detailed advises how to Catholicize Serbs. Petretić was afraid that many Catholics would convert to Orthodox Christianity because of the privileges Orthodox Serbs received. He worked hard to convert Serbs into Eastern Catholicism and wrote a detailed work about the Serbs.

In 1648 the king appointed Sava Stanislavić as bishop of the Bishopric of Marča, as wished by the Slavonian Serbs, although Petretić proposed another candidate. In 1650 Petretić persuaded Simeon Kordić, archimandrite of Lepavina, to act against the Serbs. Kordić received funds to establish school for education of Serb children as Catholics. In 1651 he wrote a work in which he elaborated how in 1600 many "Vlachs or Rascians or better to say Serb people" migrated from Ottoman Empire to the territory of Slavonia and Croatia near the Ottoman border.

In 1667 Petretić wrote a recommendation for Mijakić's appointment on the position of bishop of Marča for the supervision of the Orthodox population (who he referred to as "Morlachs or Serbs").

Bibliography 

Petretić belongs to most notable early writers in Croatian kajkavian language.

In Graz in 1651 Petretić wrote a prologue of the Saint Evangelions written by Nikola Krajačić. In order to make liturgical poems more acceptable for the readers, Petretić published them together with three folk poems, with intention to gradually replace folk poems with liturgical ones in the future publications.

References

Sources

External links 
 Website of the Archdiocese of Zagreb, a page about Petar Petretić

1604 births
1667 deaths
17th-century Jesuits
Anti-Serbian sentiment
Bishops of Zagreb
Catholicisation
Persecution of Serbs
History of the Serbs of Croatia